Josh Silver (born April 16, 1968) is an American nonprofit executive and political consultant who is the co-founder and Executive Chairman of RepresentUs, a post-partisan, nonprofit organization whose stated mission is to build the movement that fixes America's corrupt political system. Silver formerly worked as CEO and co-founder of Free Press, an "activist group that promotes accountability journalism and Internet openness". He was the director of development for a cultural arm of the Smithsonian Institution, and was the campaign manager of the successful 1998 "Clean Elections" ballot measure in Arizona. He has published on democracy, media, telecommunications, campaign finance and a range of other public policy issues. Silver has been profiled in the Wall Street Journal.

Early life and education 
Silver was born in New York City and grew up in Ashfield and Shelburne, Massachusetts. His mother, Genie Zeiger, an essayist, poet, and creative writing teacher, died in 2009. His father, Carl Silver, is a clinical psychologist in Western Massachusetts. Silver has one sister.

In 1995, he was on a river trip in Peru with a friend, Patchen Miller, when they were ambushed and shot; Silver was seriously wounded but survived; Miller did not.

Silver attended The Evergreen State College in Olympia, Washington and The University of Grenoble in France.

Views
Silver posits that a broken and corrupt political system has a paralyzing effect on nearly every issue. He advocates using the term "corruption" to describe the combined influence of lobbying, the "revolving door", and campaign contributions, as well as broken election laws that foster extremism and block competition. Silver sees this corruption as afflicting politicians of both parties.

Silver argues that past democracy reform efforts have failed partly because they were overly focused on appealing to the political Left and/or overly focused on passing reform legislation through Congress; he points out that members of Congress, who have achieved their positions under current election and campaign finance laws, are unlikely to approve legislation that would change those laws in order to increase political competition and/or limit the influence of the special interests and moneyed donors who have financed their political careers.

Silver advocates a grassroots campaign of citizen-led legislative lobbying and ballot initiatives passed at the city and state level to fix policy locally while building momentum towards national reform. The organization he co-founded and directs, RepresentUs, was established to support these grassroots anti-corruption efforts.

References

External links 
 Represent.Us – Official website RepresentUs
 Free Press – Official website of the Free Press

Living people
1968 births
Evergreen State College alumni
American business executives
Activists from New York City
People from Shelburne, Massachusetts